The knockout stage of the 2019 AFC Asian Cup was the second and final stage of the competition, following the group stage. It began on 20 January with the round of 16 and ended on 1 February with the final match, held at the Zayed Sports City Stadium in Abu Dhabi. A total of 16 teams (the top two teams from each group, along with the four best third-placed teams) advanced to the knockout stage to compete in a single-elimination style tournament.

All times are local, GST (UTC+4).

Format
In the knockout stage, if a match is level at the end of 90 minutes of normal playing time, extra time was played (two periods of 15 minutes each). If still tied after extra time, the match was decided by a penalty shoot-out to determine the winner. The video assistant referee (VAR) system was used from the quarter-finals onwards. For the first time since a knockout stage was added to the competition in 1972, there was no third place play-off.

The AFC set out the following schedule for the round of 16:
 R16-1: Runners-up Group A v Runners-up Group C
 R16-2: Winners Group D v 3rd Group B/E/F
 R16-3: Winners Group B v 3rd Group A/C/D
 R16-4: Winners Group F v Runners-up Group E
 R16-5: Winners Group C v 3rd Group A/B/F
 R16-6: Winners Group E v Runners-up Group D
 R16-7: Winners Group A v 3rd Group C/D/E
 R16-8: Runners-up Group B v Runners-up Group F

Combinations of matches in the round of 16

The specific match-ups involving the third-placed teams depended on which four third-placed teams qualified for the round of 16:

Qualified teams
The top two placed teams from each of the six groups, plus the four best-placed third teams, qualified for the knockout stage.

Bracket

Round of 16

Jordan vs Vietnam
The two had already faced each other in previous qualification phases, with all of their matches ending in draws.

Jordan came close in the 20th minute when Musa Al-Taamari lured three defenders out of position before his back-heel pass found Feras Shelbaieh, whose cross to Yaseen Al-Bakhit saw his effort going wide. In the 35th minute, Đoàn Văn Hậu's left-footed strike was parried away by Amer Shafi. Jordan took the lead in the 38th minute after Đỗ Hùng Dũng brought Salem Al-Ajalin down just outside the box. Baha' Abdel-Rahman scored from the resulting free kick into the top right corner of the net. Six minutes into the second half, Nguyễn Trọng Hoàng sent in a curling cross in front of the goal, which Nguyễn Công Phượng squeezed past the Jordanian defenders for the equaliser. Neither side managed to find a way to score in the remaining minutes, forcing the first ever AFC Asian Cup last 16 tie to go into extra time. However, both teams were unwilling to take unnecessary risks, as penalties were needed to decide the tie.

Jordan were the first to miss, with Baha' Faisal striking the crossbar, which was then followed by Ahmed Samir's effort saved by Đặng Văn Lâm. Vietnam's Trần Minh Vương also missed but Bùi Tiến Dũng I made no mistake as the Southeast Asian side advanced to the quarter-finals.

The win meant that since reunification, Vietnam had reached the quarter-finals in all their two Asian Cups they participated, but this was also the country's first ever win in the knockout stage, though technically it was a draw. For Jordan, the loss meant they have never won any competitive knockout stage games in their Asian Cup history.

Thailand vs China PR

China PR have only faced Thailand once in the AFC Asian Cup, back in 1992 which ended in a 1–1 draw.

In the 31st minute, Thitipan Puangchan's shot ended up at Supachai Jaided's feet, who turned and scored from seven yards to open the scoring. However, Yu Dabao made way for Xiao Zhi and within three minutes, China were level as Zheng Zhi clipped his cross in from the right and Xiao scored on the rebound after Siwarak Tedsungnoen had saved the striker's initial downward header. By the 71st minute, China were in front when Gao Lin scored from the spot after Tanaboon Kesarat clipped his heels in the area. Gao fired high into the top corner to give China the lead. A flying save from Yan Junling deep into injury time following Pansa Hemviboon's shot ensured the East Asian representative to win their first knockout stage match since 2004 and progress to the next round.

Iran vs Oman
 
Iran and Oman had only met once in the tournament, a 2–2 draw back in 2004.

Oman were awarded a penalty in the third minute when Majid Hosseini brought down Muhsen Al-Ghassani, only for Iran goalkeeper Alireza Beiranvand to tip Ahmed Kano’s effort from 12 yards around the post. Iran broke the deadlock in the 32nd minute, Alireza Jahanbakhsh fired home after Mohammed Al-Musalami had failed to cut out Milad Mohammadi’s long ball. Nine minutes later, Mehdi Taremi was brought down in the area by Saad Al-Mukhaini and Ashkan Dejagah stepped up to convert the resulting penalty. Eight minutes after the restart, Sardar Azmoun missed the target from 12 yards when Taremi’s long throw arrived at his feet. Harib Al-Saadi fizzed a 77th minute shot inches over Beiranvand’s bar. Iran held firm to confirm their place in the quarter-finals.

Japan vs Saudi Arabia
Japan and Saudi Arabia have met each other in four previous Asian Cup editions, with Japan holding the better record with only one loss and four wins.

Mohammed Al-Fatil sneaked in a header from the centre of the box from a set-piece situation, but the defender placed it wide of the mark. Japan came close six minutes later with Ritsu Dōan finding space in the danger area after collecting Takumi Minamino’s pass but saw his effort blocked by the Saudi defence. Japan scored the opening goal in the 20th minute as Takehiro Tomiyasu rose the highest to nod the ball home. With five minutes left in the half, Hattan Bahebri muscled his way into the box, but his curling shot flew past the right post, as Japan stayed ahead going into the break. In the second half, Maya Yoshida connected with a header from Gaku Shibasaki’s delivery but Mohammed Al-Owais collected it safely. In the 73rd minute, Abdullah Otayf found Housain Al-Mogahwi lurking in the box but the midfielder sent his header high above the bar as Japan soaked up the pressure to seal their quarter-final spot.

Australia vs Uzbekistan
Eldor Shomurodov’s change of pace left Trent Sainsbury flat-footed in the penalty area, only for Mathew Ryan to deny the striker’s effort when in on the Australian goal. Two minutes before the half hour, Uzbekistan went close as Javokhir Sidikov let fly from distance, the ball going narrowly wide of Ryan’s right post. In the second half, Jamie Maclaren’s blocked shot looped up for Rhyan Grant to head into the hands of Ignatiy Nesterov while the full-back was also on the end of Milos Degenek’s diagonal ball, sending his header over the bar from an acute angle. Nesterov was on hand to push away Tom Rogic’s deflected effort 10 minutes from time. With the 90 minutes finishing goalless, the game went into extra time and Chris Ikonomidis, Mathew Leckie and Rogic all failed to break the deadlock for the defending champions, leaving the game to drift towards a shootout.

Nesterov saved Aziz Behich's penalty in the second round of the shootout before Islom Tukhtakhodjaev was denied by Ryan and, with Dostonbek Khamdamov missing in the penultimate round, Leckie struck to take Australia through.

United Arab Emirates vs Kyrgyzstan
The Emiratis went ahead in the 13th minute through a Khamis Esmaeel header from Ismail Matar’s corner. Kyrgyzstan bounced back shortly before the half-hour mark, Akhlidin Israilov’s pass found Mirlan Murzaev who rounded UAE goalkeeper Khalid Eisa and finished to draw his side level. Matar threatened to restore the UAE’s lead when he fizzed a shot from distance narrowly over as the first half drew to a close. After the break, Ali Mabkhout headed Bandar Al-Ahbabi’s cross inches wide of the post, before a curling Valery Kichin delivery thudded against Eisa’s crossbar with the custodian beaten. In the 64th minute, the UAE went ahead once again. This time, Mabkhout collected Amer Abdulrahman’s pass and shot the ball beyond Kutman Kadyrbekov. Tursunali Rustamov headed home a last gasp equaliser following Anton Zemlianukhin’s cross to send the match into extra-time.

Mabkhout spurned an early chance in the second minute of the additional 30, before just 60 seconds later, the striker was brought down in the area by Bekzhan Sagynbaev. Substitute Ahmed Khalil stepped up to convert the resulting penalty and put his side ahead yet again. Bakhtiyar Duyshobekov’s header then brushed the upright and Rustamov slammed a shot against the bar in the final seconds. However, the UAE held firm to seal their ticket to the last eight.

South Korea vs Bahrain
 
Mohamed Marhoon forced Korean goalkeeper Kim Seung-gyu into a dive but his effort flew wide in the fourth minute. Two minutes from the half-time whistle, Son Heung-min laid a pass to Lee Yong on the right flank, who then sent the ball into the box which was blocked by goalkeeper Sayed Shubbar Alawi, only for it to land at Hwang Hee-chan’s feet who then tapped it into the net. In the 70th minute, the Korean defenders failed to cleanly clear a corner kick, allowing Jamal Rashid to fire a shot which seemed heading into the top right corner, only for Seung-gyu to palm it out. The Korean defence was breached for the first time in the tournament when Mohamed Al Romaihi slammed the ball into the net after Hong Chul had made a last ditch clearance of Mahdi Al-Humaidan’s attempt. Hwang Ui-jo intercepted a poor back pass in added time but his attempt to curl the ball past an onrushing Alawi went wide. The tie was then subsequently forced into extra-time.

Bahrain were caught off guard when Yong sent in a cross from the right which Kim Jin-su met with a header to seal his team's place in the quarter-finals.

Qatar vs Iraq
Qatar spurned the first opportunity of the game when Abdelkarim Hassan rattled the bar with a shot from close-range following Abdulaziz Hatem’s cross in the fourth minute. Hatem came close to connecting with Abdelkarim’s whipped delivery, only for goalkeeper Saad Al-Sheeb to then dive at the feet of an onrushing Mohanad Ali to repel Iraq’s opening attack of the tie. Abdelkarim’s deflected cross brushed an upright and Bassam Al-Rawi headed Akram Afif’s corner wide of the target. Qatar went ahead on 62 minutes after Al-Rawi curled home a free-kick. Moments later, Jalal Hassan spread himself well to deny Abdelkarim, before producing another fine stop to keep out a Hatem drive from distance. Ali Adnan flashed a free-kick inches past the post and then Ahmad Ibrahim's 80th minute header missed by a similarly fine margin. Qatar held firm despite late Iraqi pressure to win their first ever knockout stage's match and moved on to the next round.

Quarter-finals

Vietnam vs Japan

Koya Kitagawa’s pass to Genki Haraguchi in the 23rd minute was slid out of play by Vietnamese defender Đỗ Duy Mạnh. The resulting corner saw Haraguchi send in a curler that found Maya Yoshida, who headed the ball into the back of the net. However, VAR was called into action for the first time in the history of the Asian Cup and much to Vietnam’s relief, Emirati referee Mohammed Abdulla Hassan Mohamed disallowed the goal as Yoshida’s header had deflected off his arm. Shūichi Gonda was forced into making his first save of the match as Phan Văn Đức came close with a 37th minute strike, before being called into action again a minute later to deny another close-range attempt from Văn Đức. Ritsu Dōan’s run was blocked by Bùi Tiến Dũng I and the referee, after another VAR check, awarded a penalty which Doan converted in the 57th minute. Substitute Nguyễn Phong Hồng Duy came close to equalising in the 73rd minute, but his low drive missed the upright by mere inches.

China PR vs Iran

In the 18th minute, Sardar Azmoun stole the ball from Feng Xiaoting before squaring it to Mehdi Taremi who fired home to give Iran the lead. The Iranians then spurned a chance to double their advantage when Hossein Kanaanizadegan found Taremi from Ashkan Dejagah’s free-kick only to somehow miss the target from only three yards. Azmoun out-muscled Liu Yiming and rounded goalkeeper Yan Junling to score shortly after the half-hour mark. After the break, Taremi and Kanaanizadegan looped headers narrowly over the bar, before Alireza Jahanbakhsh curled an effort narrowly wide of Yan's left-hand upright on 58 minutes. Substitute Yu Dabao missed from close-range with 10 minutes remaining leaving Karim Ansarifard to net another for Iran after yet another defensive error. The victory allowed Iran to play in the semi-finals for the first time since 2004 edition where they finished third-place.

South Korea vs Qatar
 
Akram Afif brought a save out of goalkeeper Kim Seung-gyu shortly after the half-hour mark. Moments later, midfielder Hwang In-beom curled a shot narrowly wide from the edge of the area after Qatar had failed to adequately deal with Lee Yong's free kick. In the second half, Hwang Ui-jo controlled the ball before bringing a fine save out of Qatari custodian Saad Al-Sheeb. Kim Jin-su grazed the outside of an upright with a free kick, before Qatar took the lead minutes later. Gathering possession some 25 yards from goal, Abdulaziz Hatem sent the ball past Seung-gyu’s dive and into the bottom corner. Within seconds, Ui-jo had a goal ruled out by the VAR for offside, while Boualem Khoukhi's overhead kick was repelled by Seung-gyu. Late and intense South Korean pressure failed to find the equaliser, leaving Qatar to progress to the next round.

United Arab Emirates vs Australia

Mathew Ryan denied the hosts at the 20 minute mark when Ismail Al Hammadi stepped inside Trent Sainsbury to fire off an effort that the Socceroos keeper pushed away. With five minutes left in the half, Apostolos Giannou's shot on goal was swatted clear by Khalid Eisa. At the other end, Ali Mabkhout headed over from close range. In the second half, Giannou had the ball in the net following the introduction of Mathew Leckie for Jamie Maclaren, but his effort was ruled out for offside. In the 68th minute, Mabkhout put the UAE ahead with their first opening of the second period, the forward stepped in to intercept Milos Degenek's back-pass before rounding Ryan to score. Australia attempted to claw back an equaliser but the Socceroos came up short to end their reign as Asian champions.

Semi-finals

Iran vs Japan

Iran and Japan have faced each other in three previous Asian Cup editions, with Japan winning one. The rest were draws. Iran have never scored a goal against Japan in every Asian Cup that the two teams met.

Yuya Osako's ball found space behind Alireza Jahanbakhsh and the advancing Yuto Nagatomo sent in a low cross, but Takumi Minamino missed his chance. Maya Yoshida headed wide from Gaku Shibasaki's corner while Ritsu Dōan also aimed his shot wide. In the opening minutes of the second half, Ashkan Dejagah and Ehsan Hajsafi both saw their attempts miss the target. Moments later, Hossein Kanaanizadegan turned to protest to referee Chris Beath following a collision with Minamino and, while the Australian ignored Iran's pleas, Minamino sent in a cross which was headed home by Osako. Jahanbakhsh almost restored parity five minutes later, only for Shūichi Gonda to tip his free-kick over the bar while Morteza Pouraliganji headed just off target moments later. Minamino's pass into the centre struck the sliding Pouraliganji on the arm. The resulting penalty saw Osako send Alireza Beiranvand the wrong way to double Japan's lead. In added time, Genki Haraguchi added Japan's third goal with a burst through the defence before smashing his shot past Beiranvand to confirm the Samurai Blue's progress to the final.

For Iran, this loss meant that the country's Asian Cup thirst has been extended to 47 years since the last win on home soil back in 1976 and for Japan, since the professionalisation of football in the 1990s, they have made it into the final in five out of eight tournaments, which remains a record.

Qatar vs United Arab Emirates

Qatar took the lead at the 22nd minute, Boualem Khoukhi's angled drive from 18 yards found its way under Khalid Eisa's dive and into the net. The UAE responded through an Ismail Al Hammadi header which was saved by Saad Al-Sheeb and a similar effort from Ali Mabkhout that fizzed wide of the target shortly before the half-hour mark. Qatar doubled their lead in the 38th minute. Akram Afif found Almoez Ali who advanced into the area before firing home via a post to equal Ali Daei's record for the most goals by a single player at Asia's premier men's football event. Shortly after, Al Sheeb was on hand to deny Ahmed Khalil. Qatar added a third in the 81st minute when captain Hassan Al-Haydos manoeuvred past Bandar Al-Ahbabi and clipped the ball over Eisa. After the UAE's Ismail Ahmed was shown a straight red card late on for dangerous play, substitute Hamid Ismail rounded off the scoring to confirm Qatar's place in the final.

The match was marred by bottle- and footwear-throwing incidents committed by the UAE supporters. This conduct was preceded by booing the Qatari national anthem. The two countries have had a hostile relationship and had cut ties due to the then-ongoing diplomatic crisis.

Final

References

External links
 

2019 AFC Asian Cup